The Tides of Time is a science fiction novel by John Brunner. It was first published in the United States by Ballantine Del Rey Books in 1984.  The novel tells the story of two people on an isolated island, each time they awoke from sleep, they lived a different life in a different time.

Reception
Dave Langford reviewed The Tides of Time for White Dwarf #78, and stated that "Brunner's philosophical contention probably needs a whole book. Here it gets about 30 pages, and it's a tribute to his skill that he keeps you reading until then."

Reviews
Review by Bob Collins (1984) in Fantasy Review, December 1984
Review by Richard E. Geis (1985) in Science Fiction Review, Spring 1985
Review by Robert Coulson (1985) in Amazing Stories, May 1985
Review by Tom Easton (1985) in Analog Science Fiction/Science Fact, July 1985
Review by Roland J. Green (1986) in Far Frontiers, Volume IV/Winter 1985
Review by David Willis (1986) in Paperback Inferno, #61
Review [German] by Michael Nagula (1988) in Das Science Fiction Jahr Ausgabe 1988
Review by Peter T. Garratt (1989) in Interzone, #32 November–December 1989

References

1984 British novels
1984 science fiction novels
American science fiction novels
Del Rey books
Novels about time travel
Novels by John Brunner